This is a list of members of the National Parliament of Papua New Guinea from 2012 to 2017, as elected at the 2012 election.

Notes

References

List
Papua New Guinea politics-related lists